B. B. Martin Tobacco Warehouse is a historic tobacco warehouse located at Lancaster, Lancaster County, Pennsylvania. It was built about 1875, and is a 2 1/2-story, red brick building on a stone foundation.  It is five bays by three bays and has a moderate pitched slate covered gable roof.

It was listed on the National Register of Historic Places in 1990.

References

Industrial buildings and structures on the National Register of Historic Places in Pennsylvania
Industrial buildings completed in 1875
Buildings and structures in Lancaster, Pennsylvania
Tobacco buildings in the United States
National Register of Historic Places in Lancaster, Pennsylvania
1875 establishments in Pennsylvania